The Surrey Shield is an annual rugby union knock-out club competition organised by the Surrey Rugby Football Union.  It was introduced in 1998 and the inaugural winners were Cobham.  It is the third most important rugby union cup competition in Surrey, behind the Surrey Cup and Surrey Trophy but ahead of the Surrey Bowl.  

The Surrey Shield is currently open to club sides based in Surrey and parts of south London, that play in tier 9 (Surrey 1) and tier 10 (Surrey 2) of the English rugby union league system.  The format is a knockout cup with a first round, quarter-final, semi-finals and final to be held at Molesey Road (Esher's home ground) in May on the same date and same venue as the other Surrey finals.

Surrey Shield winners

Number of wins
Old Freemen's (5)
Old Whitgiftian (3)
Battersea Ironsides (2)
KCS Old Boys (2)
Old Wimbledonians (2)
Chipstead (1)
Chobham (1)
Cobham (1)
Cranleigh (1)
Kingston (1)
Old Walcountians (1)

See also
Surrey RFU
Surrey Cup
Surrey Trophy
Surrey Bowl

References

External links
Surrey RFU

Recurring sporting events established in 1998
1998 establishments in England
Rugby union cup competitions in England
Rugby union in Surrey